The Clarinda and Page Apartments were located at 3027 Farnam Street and 305–11 Turner Boulevard in the Midtown area of Omaha, Nebraska. Built in 1909 and 1914 respectively, they both reflected the Georgian Revival style of architecture. 

The buildings were designated an Omaha Landmark on April 21, 1981. According to the City of Omaha's Landmarks Heritage Preservation Commission, "the Clarinda and Page represent the type of luxury apartments which developed along the city’s picturesque parks and boulevard system after the turn-of-the-century."

The building was demolished in 2014.

It was stated to be "on record with the National Register of Historic Places". According to a letter to the editor, "In a 2003 study by Webb and Hunt, the Clarinda/Page was also recommended as eligible for the National Register of Historic Places, based on 'Architectural Significance.'"

It is unclear whether a determination of NRHP-eligibility was applied for and/or obtained (as there is no mention in NRHP weekly lists of 2014).

The building was vacant from 2006 on, and was demolished by Mutual of Omaha in 2014 after a failed campaign to save it.

Mutual of Omaha may have planned to make an office building.

See also
 Landmarks in Omaha, Nebraska

References

Apartment buildings in Omaha, Nebraska
Omaha Landmarks
National Register of Historic Places in Omaha, Nebraska
Residential buildings completed in 1909
Residential buildings completed in 1914
Residential buildings on the National Register of Historic Places in Nebraska